Nasaan Ka, Elisa? is a Philippine crime drama television series loosely based on the 2010 Telemundo telenovela ¿Dónde está Elisa?, an adaptation of the original 2009 Chilean telenovela of the same name. It is topbilled by Melissa Ricks. The series was aired on ABS-CBN's Primetime Bida block and worldwide on The Filipino Channel from September 12, 2011 to January 13, 2012.

Since July 2016, the series is streaming online on YouTube.

Overview
Initially, Nasaan Ka, Elisa? was supposed to be part of ABS-CBN's new line up afternoon dramas; it was promoted along with Mula Sa Puso and Maria la del Barrio as part of Kapamilya Gold. The tentative airing date was March 21, 2011. After the delayed airing, the drama finally premiered on September 12, 2011 on Primetime Bida, replacing the evening talk show SNN: Showbiz News Ngayon.

After its final episode on January 13, 2012, Nasaan Ka, Elisa? was replaced by Walang Hanggan (where Ricks and Bascon herself & himself is one of the cast members) which premiered on January 16, 2012.

Premise
Elisa Altamira (Melissa Ricks) is a beautiful and wealthy teenager. The eldest daughter of Mariano (Albert Martinez) and Dana Altamira (Agot Isidro), Elisa is lauded as the perfect daughter. Yet, she is not who her parents think she is.

One night after Mariano's party, Elisa insisted on her father to go out with her younger sister Christina (Isabella de Leon) and her cousins Santi (Franco Daza) and Edward (Aldred Gatchalian). They go to a local club where they are having a party, they saw Elisa dancing gracefully. But afterwards, the three except Elisa got drunk and later discovers that she is missing. The family hire private investigators to find out what happened to Elisa.

Cast and characters

Main cast

Supporting cast
 Jamilla Obispo as Isabel Coronado
 Tibo Jumalon as Esteban Briseño
 Cecil Paz as Lupita

Guest cast 
 Crispin Pineda as Javier Garcia
 Yayo Aguila as Adriana Valdez
 Gerald Madrid as Ricardo Dela Fuente
 Andre Tiangco as Anthony Chua
 Kristel Moreno as Alex Perez
 Allan Paule as Alberto Ventura
 Neil Ryan Sese as Luis Mañalac
 Lander Vera Perez as Armand Caceres
 Arnold Reyes as Coach Justin Zialcita
 Hiyasmin Neri as Romina Rodriguez
 Rico Barrera as Abner Murillo

Reception

Critical response
In a review done by Philippine Entertainment Portal, they mentioned that Nasaan Ka Elisa? "offers something new to the local TV landscape based on its crime-thriller plot."

Ratings
Nasaan Ka, Elisa? debuted at the fourth spot over-all nationwide (with a 26.7% rating or almost 27 million viewers). On its second day, the drama had 26.2% ratings.

See also
List of programs broadcast by ABS-CBN
List of ABS-CBN drama series
¿Dónde está Elisa? (Telemundo, United States)
¿Dónde está Elisa? (TVN, Chile)

References

External links

ABS-CBN drama series
Philippine crime television series
Philippine thriller television series
Philippine television series based on telenovelas
Philippine LGBT-related television shows
2011 Philippine television series debuts
2012 Philippine television series endings
Television series by Dreamscape Entertainment Television
Filipino-language television shows
Television shows set in the Philippines